Kelly George (born 19 December 1970) is a British actor, best known for his long association with the BBC school drama series, playing Ray Haynes in Grange Hill.

Acting
George's acting career began in 1984 playing Charlie Bates in Cameron Mackintosh's "Oliver" and after finishing, was asked to join Sylvia Young Theatre School. While studying there. he filmed "Who Sir Me Sir", "Three Penny Opera", " No Place Like Home", "Christine", and had a Carl Davis musical written for him: " Kips War" where he played the title character Kip.

George's first became associated with "Grange Hill" in 1986, when he appeared on the BBC programme Drugwatch Special: It's Not Just Zammo. The programme, a hybrid of both Crimewatch and "Grange Hill", was broadcast on 1 April 1986 to link with the Grange Hill storyline of Zammo McGuire's heroin addiction.

In 1987, George appeared in Grange Hill as one of a gang of boys from rival school, St Joseph's, who were causing trouble with deputy head Mr Bronson, though, he is best known as motormouth Ray Haynes, a Grange Hill pupil whom he played from 1991 to 1993. In a surprise move, Ray was brought back to Grange Hill in 1997, this time as the proprietor of a cafe near the school where the incumbent pupils "hung out" and made up the bulk of his customers.

While filming Grange Hill, George appeared as himself in many TV Shows including The Broom Cupboard, "Blue Peter" and Going Live where he was interviewed by Robbie Williams. George finally left Grange Hill in 2002. Since then, he has appeared in The Bill and Casualty, the latter being his second appearance in the programme.

Filmography

References

External links

Living people
1970 births